The Waltons is an American historical drama television series about a family in rural Virginia during the Great Depression and World War II. It was created by Earl Hamner Jr., based on his 1961 book Spencer's Mountain and the 1963 film of the same name. The series aired from 1972 to 1981.

The television film The Homecoming: A Christmas Story was broadcast on December 19, 1971. Based on its success, the CBS television network ordered the first season of episodes (to be based on the same characters) and that became the television series The Waltons. Beginning in September 1972, the series aired on CBS for nine seasons in total. After the series was canceled in 1981, three television film sequels aired in 1982 on NBC, with three more in the 1990s on CBS. The Waltons was produced by Lorimar Productions and distributed by Warner Bros. Domestic Television Distribution in syndication. 

The show's end sequence featured the family saying goodnight to one another before drifting off to sleep. According to the BBC (which also aired the series) "Goodnight, John-Boy" was one of the most common catchphrases of the 1970s.

Premise

Setting
The main story is set in Walton's Mountain, a fictional mountain community in the fictitious Jefferson County, Virginia.

The real place upon which the stories are based is the community of Schuyler in Nelson County, Virginia.

The time period is from 1933 to 1946, during the Great Depression and World War II, during the presidential administrations of Franklin D. Roosevelt and Harry S. Truman. The year 1933 is suggested by a reference to the opening of the Century of Progress exposition in Chicago, a brief shot of an automobile registration, and it is divulged in episode 5 that the date is in the spring of 1933. The last episode of season one, "An Easter Story," is set in February – April 1934. The year 1934 takes two  seasons to cover, while some successive years are covered over the course of a few months.

The series finale, "The Revel," revolves around a party and the invitation date is given as June 4, 1946. A span of 13 years is therefore covered in nine seasons. There are some chronological inconsistencies, most of which do not hinder the storyline.  The episode depicting the attack on Pearl Harbor was broadcast on December 7, 1978, a Thursday, which coordinated the month and date on which the attack occurred and the day of the week on which the series was broadcast.

The first three reunion movies (A Wedding on Walton's Mountain, Mother's Day on Walton's Mountain, and A Day for Thanks on Walton's Mountain), all produced in 1982, are set in 1947. Of the later reunions, A Walton Thanksgiving Reunion, filmed in 1993, is set in 1963, and revolves around President John F. Kennedy's assassination. A Walton Wedding, made in 1995, is set in 1964, and A Walton Easter, filmed in 1997, is set in 1969.

The series began relating stories that occurred 39 years in the past and ended with its last reunion show set 28 years in the past.

A continuity error exists in how many years John and Olivia are said to be married in the last reunion movie, counting back to the first episode. In the reunion movie, John and Olivia are celebrating their 40th wedding anniversary in 1969, which dates their wedding to 1929. however John Boy is 17 years old in the series' first episode set in 1933. In the pilot episode The Homecoming: A Christmas Story, set during Christmas, 1933, Olivia remarks she and John had been married 17 years, which would put their marriage in 1916. John Boy is 15 years old, making his birth year 1918. Also, in the pilot, the adult John Boy, as narrator, mentions his father died in 1969.

Story

The story is about the family of John Walton Jr. (known as John-Boy): his six siblings, his parents John and Olivia Walton, and paternal grandparents Zebulon "Zeb" and Esther Walton. John-Boy is the oldest of the seven children (15 years old in The Homecoming; 17 at the beginning of the series), who becomes a journalist and novelist. Each episode is narrated at the opening and closing by a middle-aged John Jr. (voiced by author Earl Hamner on whom John-Boy is based). John Sr., who quit his city job after the traumatic events in the pilot episode, manages to eke out a living for his family by operating a lumber mill with the help of his sons as they grow older. The family income is augmented by some small-scale farming, and John occasionally hunts to put meat on the table. In the simpler days of their country youth, all of the children are rambunctious and curious, but as times grow tough, the children slowly depart from the innocent, carefree days of walking everywhere barefoot while clad in overalls and hand-sewn pinafores, and into the harsh, demanding world of adulthood and responsibility.

The family shares hospitality with relatives and strangers as they are able. The small community named after their property is also home to folk of various income levels, ranging from the well-to-do Baldwin sisters, two elderly spinsters who distill moonshine that they call "Papa's recipe;" Ike Godsey, postmaster and owner of the general store with his somewhat snobbish wife Corabeth (a Walton cousin; she calls her husband "Mr. Godsey"); an African-American couple, Verdie and Harley Foster; Maude Gormley, a sassy octogenarian artist who paints on wood; Flossie Brimmer, a friendly though somewhat gossipy widow who runs a nearby boarding house; and Yancy Tucker, a good-hearted handyman with big plans but little motivation. Jefferson County sheriff Ep Bridges, who fought alongside John in World War I and was awarded the Medal of Honor, keeps law and order in Walton's Mountain. The entire family (except for John) attends a Baptist church, of which Olivia and Grandma Esther are the most regular attendees.

In the signature scene that closes almost every episode, the family house is enveloped in darkness, save for 1, 2 or 3 lights in the upstairs bedroom windows. Through voice-overs, two or more characters make some brief comments related to that episode's events, and then bid each other goodnight, after which the lights go out.

After completing high school, John-Boy attends fictional Boatwright University in the fictional nearby town of Westham. He later goes to New York City to work as a journalist.

During the latter half of the 1976–77 season, Grandma Esther Walton suffers a stroke and returns home shortly before the death of her husband, Grandpa Zeb Walton (reflecting Ellen Corby's real-life stroke and the death of Will Geer, the actors who portrayed those characters).

During the series' last few years, Mary Ellen and Ben start their own families; Erin, Jason and John-Boy are married in later television movie sequels. Younger children Jim-Bob and Elizabeth struggle to find and cement true love.

World War II deeply affects the family. All four Walton boys enlist in the military. Mary Ellen's physician husband, Curtis "Curt" Willard, is sent to Pearl Harbor and is reported to have perished in the Japanese attack on December 7, 1941. Years later, Mary Ellen hears of sightings of her "late" husband, investigates and finds him alive (played by another actor), but brooding over his war wounds and living under an assumed name. She divorces him and later remarries.

John-Boy's military plane is shot down, while Olivia becomes a volunteer at the VA hospital and is seen less and less. She eventually develops tuberculosis and enters an Arizona sanatorium. Olivia's cousin, Rose Burton, moves in at the Walton house to look after the family. Two years later, John Sr. moves to Arizona to be with Olivia. Grandma appears in only a handful of episodes during the eighth season. She was usually said to be visiting relatives in nearby Buckingham County. Consistent with the effects of Ellen Corby's actual stroke, Grandma rarely speaks during the remainder of the series, usually limited to uttering brief one-or two-word lines such as "No!" or "Oh, boy!"

Six feature-length movies were made after the series run. Set from 1947 to 1969, they aired between 1982 and 1997.

Episodes

Characters

 John "John-Boy" Walton Jr. (Richard Thomas, seasons 1–5, guest seasons 6–7, three movie sequels; Robert Wightman, seasons 8–9 and one movie sequel), the eldest of the 7 children
 John Walton Sr. (Ralph Waite, seasons 1–8, 8 episodes of season 9 and all movie sequels), the family patriarch (Andrew Duggan starred as John Sr. in The Homecoming movie only)
 Olivia Walton (Michael Learned, seasons 1–7, guest season 8, and 4 movies), the matriarch (Patricia Neal starred as Olivia in The Homecoming movie only)
 Zebulon "Grandpa" Walton (Will Geer, seasons 1–6), John's father (Edgar Bergen starred as Zebulon in The Homecoming movie only). Due to Geer's declining health during the sixth season, the script was adapted to the fictional death of his character with Geer's death in 1978.
 Esther "Grandma" Walton (Ellen Corby, seasons 1–5 & 7, 2 episodes in seasons 6 and 8, and in 5 movies), John's mother
 Jason Walton (Jon Walmsley, entire series and 6 movies), second-oldest brother; musically talented
 Mary Ellen Walton (Judy Norton Taylor, entire series and 6 movies), headstrong oldest daughter; becomes a nurse 
 Erin Walton (Mary Elizabeth McDonough, entire series and 6 movies), second Walton daughter; works as a telephone operator and as manufacturing supervisor
 Benjamin "Ben" Walton (Eric Scott, entire series and 6 movies), third Walton son; has an entrepreneurial spirit
 James Robert "Jim-Bob" Walton (David W. Harper, entire series and 6 movies), youngest Walton son; mechanically inclined
 Elizabeth Walton (Kami Cotler, entire series and 6 movies), youngest of the 7 children
 Ike Godsey (Joe Conley, entire series), proprietor of the general store (Woodrow Parfrey starred as Ike in The Homecoming movie only)
 Corabeth Walton Godsey (Ronnie Claire Edwards), seasons 3–9, John Walton's cousin
 Curtis Willard (Tom Bower, seasons 5–7), Mary Ellen's husband
 Cindy Walton (Leslie Winston, seasons 7–9 and 4 of the reunion movies), Ben's wife
 Rose Burton (Peggy Rea, seasons 8–9 and 1 sequel), Olivia's matronly cousin who fills in as matriarch during Olivia's absence

Production

Inspiration
Earl Hamner's rural childhood growing up in the unincorporated community of Schuyler, Virginia, provided the basis for the setting and many of the storylines of The Waltons. His family and the community provided many life experiences which aided in the characters, values, area, and human-interest stories of his books, movies, and television series. Hamner provided the voice-over of the older John-Boy, usually heard at the beginning and end of each episode.

Television film
The Homecoming: A Christmas Story (1971) was not made as a pilot for a series, but it was so popular that it led to CBS initially commissioning one season of episodes based on the same characters, and the result was The Waltons. Except for the Walton children and Grandma Esther Walton, the characters  were all recast for the TV series. The musical score was by Oscar-winning composer Jerry Goldsmith and was later released on an album by Film Score Monthly paired with James Horner's score for the 1982 TV movie Rascals and Robbers: The Secret Adventures of Tom Sawyer and Huck Finn. (Goldsmith also scored several episodes of the first season, but the producers believed his TV movie theme was too gentle and requested he write a new theme for the series.) The series was also commissioned in response to the rural purge that the networks in general and CBS specifically had done that eliminated most rural-themed shows in 1971, and the subsequent backlash from fans of those shows that were still popular at the time of their cancelation.

Patricia Neal (as Olivia) won a Golden Globe Award for Best Actress - Television Series Drama. The movie was also nominated for 3 Emmys: Primetime Emmy Award for Outstanding Lead Actress in a Miniseries or a Movie (Neal), Outstanding Writing Achievement in Drama - Adaptation (Earl Hamner), and Outstanding Directorial Achievement in Drama - A Single Program (Fielder Cook).

Filming
The town of Walton's Mountain was built in the rear area of the main lot at Warner Bros. Studios, bordering the Los Angeles River, but the mountain itself was part of the Hollywood Hills range opposite Warner studios in Burbank, California, the reverse side of which, and slightly to the east, is Mount Lee and the Hollywood Sign. The Waltons house façade was built in the back of the Warner Brothers lot. After the series concluded, the set was destroyed. For the reunion shows, a replica Waltons' house façade was built on the Here Come the Brides set on the Columbia Ranch studio, now part of the Warner Brothers studios. The Waltons' house is still used as scenery at Warner Brothers. For example, it served as the Dragonfly Inn on Gilmore Girls.

For the first few seasons, the show would oftentimes shoot exterior scenes in Frazier Park, 70 miles to the north of Los Angeles. They would also occasionally film scenes in Franklin Canyon Park in Beverly Hills.

Release

Broadcast 
Some sources indicate CBS put the show on its fall 1972 schedule in response to congressional hearings on the quality of television. Backlash from a 1971 decision to purge most rural-oriented shows from the network lineup may have also been a factor. The network gave The Waltons an undesirable timeslot – Thursdays at 8 p.m – opposite 2 popular programs: The Flip Wilson Show on NBC and The Mod Squad on ABC. "The rumor was that they put it against Flip Wilson and The Mod Squad because they didn't think it would survive. They thought, 'We can just tell Congress America doesn't want to see this'," Kami Cotler, who played Elizabeth Walton, said in a 2012 interview. However, CBS had enough faith in the show to devise a full-page newspaper ad flanked with the show's positive reviews, urging people to watch the show. Radically increased ratings were attributed to this ad, saving The Waltons.

Ralph Waite was reluctant to audition for the part of John Walton because he didn't want to be tied to a long-running TV series, but his agent persuaded him by saying, "It will never sell. You do the pilot. You pick up a couple of bucks and then you go back to New York."

Following the cancelation of the series in 1981, a total of six reunion movies were released: A Wedding on Walton's Mountain (1982), Mother's Day on Walton's Mountain (1982), A Day for Thanks on Walton's Mountain (1982), A Walton Thanksgiving Reunion (1993), A Walton Wedding (1995), and A Walton Easter (1997).

Syndication 
Lorimar sold the distribution rights of The Waltons to Warner Bros. Television to avoid a lawsuit owing to the similarities between the series and the film Spencer's Mountain (1963), which Warner owned. Warner Bros. acquired Lorimar in 1989, and has continued to syndicate the series ever since.

Reruns have aired in the U.S. on MeTV since January 1, 2020, and also on INSP and Hallmark Drama, and formerly aired on Hallmark Channel. In Canada, The Waltons airs on Vision TV and BookTelevision.

In the UK, the series was broadcast on BBC 2 and BBC 1 and  during the 1970s/1980s – the first three seasons were broadcast on BBC 2 from February 18, 1974, to May 17, 1976, on Mondays at 20.00 GMT, and seasons 4 and 5 were shown on BBC 1 from September 5, 1976, to August 30, 1977, on Sundays at 16.10 in 1976 and Tuesdays at 19.00 through 1977. After that, seasons 6–9 would be broadcast on BBC 2 again, starting on April 30, 1979, and concluding in April 1983. The three reunion TV movies filmed in 1982 were also shown on BBC 2 from December 21 to December 28, 1983. The show was repeated on Channel 4 between 1986 and 1991 and again from 1996 to 2000. It last aired on Sony Channel until March 31, 2020, in the UK.

Home media 

Warner Home Video has released all nine seasons and six TV movies of The Waltons on DVD in Region 1. Seasons 1–4 have been released in Region 2. The pilot movie, The Homecoming: A Christmas Story, was released by Paramount Home Entertainment. Lorimar produced the series, CBS produced the pilot film, which is why Paramount, under CBS Home Entertainment, handles home video rights for The Homecoming.

German-release DVDs provide German or English soundtrack options, with dubbed German voices, or the original English soundtrack, although the German episode titles are not always either literal or precise translations of the original English-language titles.

Streaming
Seasons 1–9 are available via streaming in standard-definition as well as high-definition video through services such as Amazon Prime Video.

Reception

Accolades
The Waltons won the Primetime Emmy Award for Outstanding Drama Series in 1973. Also in 1973 Richard Thomas won the Emmy for Lead Actor in a Drama Series. Michael Learned won the Emmy for Lead Actress in a Drama Series 3 times (1973, 1974, and 1976). Ellen Corby was also a three-time winner in the Supporting Actress category, winning in 1973, 1975, and 1976. Will Geer was awarded the Supporting Actor Emmy in 1975. Veteran actress Beulah Bondi won an Emmy in 1977 for Lead Actress in a Single Performance for her guest appearance as Martha Corrine Walton in the episode "The Pony Cart" (Episode #111). She first appeared in The Waltons episode "The Conflict" (Episode #51) as the widow of Zeb Walton's brother.

The series itself earned a Peabody Award for its first season. In 2013, TV Guide ranked The Waltons No. 34 on its list of the 60 Best Series of All Time.

In 2017, from March 20 to March 24, INSP network remembered the life of Earl Hamner Jr. (who died in 2016) by featuring clips of interviews (once per episode) with him about his time involved with The Waltons during the breaks while its syndicated reruns aired from 3–5pm and again at 7pm.

Cultural significance
On January 27, 1992, then-President George H. W. Bush said, "We are going to keep on trying to strengthen the American family, to make American families a lot more like the Waltons and a lot less like the Simpsons." In response, The Simpsons made a short animated segment for a repeat showing of the episode "Stark Raving Dad", in which the family watches the speech, and Bart remarks, "Hey, we're just like the Waltons. We're prayin' for an end to the Depression, too."

Reboot TV films

On November 28, 2021, The CW (part-owned by CBS and Warner Bros.) aired The Waltons: Homecoming, a remake of The Homecoming: A Christmas Story. Also set in 1933, this film features the Walton family (portrayed by new actors) minus Ben, waiting for John to get home by bus. Richard Thomas narrated. Executive producer Sam Haskell hopes the movie will lead to a new series. Another film A Waltons Thanksgiving aired on November 20, 2022.In it, Ben was added to the family. Ratings for the second reboot film were much lower.

See also
 These Are the Days; animated TV series produced by Hanna-Barbera which was inspired by The Waltons

References

Further reading

External links
 
 The Waltons  at the Encyclopedia of Television
 The Surviving Waltons: Where Are They Now?
 The Waltons  at HallmarkChannel.com

1970s American drama television series
1972 American television series debuts
1980s American drama television series
1981 American television series endings
Best Drama Series Golden Globe winners
CBS original programming
English-language television shows
Fictional married couples
Great Depression television series
Peabody Award-winning television programs
Period family drama television series
Primetime Emmy Award for Outstanding Drama Series winners
Television shows based on American novels
Television series by Lorimar Television
Television series set in the 1930s
Television series set in the 1940s
Television shows set in Virginia
Television series about families
 
World War II television drama series